Stockholm Lisboa Project is a Portuguese/Swedish folk music band.

History 
Founded in 2006 they are based in Sweden and Portugal, and have received the German Record Critics' Award (2009 and 2013), was selected for a showcase at Womex in Copenhagen. The band was nominated to the Songlines Music Awards 2010 and also the Swedish Folk & World Music Awards 2012.

The group has played live radio concerts for RDP in Portugal (2007, 2008, 2009), SR in Sweden (2007), WDR in Germany (2009), NDR in Germany (2016), YLE in Finland (2008), Spanish National Radio (2011) as well as concerts in festivals and concert halls around the world.

Line-up

Current members 
Simon Stålspets - nordic mandola, goat horn, willow flute, harmonica, vocals
Sérgio Crisóstomo - violin, vocals
Rita Maria - lead vocals
Alice Andersson - saxophone, vocals

Past members 
Liana - vocalist (member from 2006~2011, participated on the records "Sol" (2007) & "Diagonal" (2009))
Luis Peixoto - mandolin (member from 2006~2007, participated on the record "Sol" (2007))
Micaela Vaz - vocalist
Filip Jers - harmonica

Discography 
2007: Sol
2009: Diagonal
2012: Aurora
2016: Janela

References

External links 
Official home page
Simon Stålspets (Official website)
Sérgio Crisóstomo (Official website)

Swedish folk music groups
Swedish folk music
Portuguese folk music
Westpark Music artists